Jerman is a surname. Notable people with the surname include:

Abdulellah Jerman (born 1992), Saudi footballer
Aja Jerman  (born 1999), Slovenian rhythmic gymnast
Andrej Jerman (born 1978), Slovenian alpine skier
Cornelia Petty Jerman (1874–1946), American suffragist
Eddy Jerman (1865–1936), American inventor
Greg Jerman (born 1979), American football player
Lindsey Jerman (1915–1996), English cricketer
Marcos Luis Jerman (born 1957), Argentinian-Slovenian cross-country skier
Vida Jerman (1939–2011), Croatian theatre actress
Wilson Roosevelt Jerman (1929–2020), American butler; served in the White House
Željko Jerman (1949–2006), Croatian photographer